Chitra Express is a Bangladeshi Intercity train which runs between the capital city Dhaka and the south western city Khulna.

Name
This train is named after the river Chitra of Narail.

Schedule
Chitra Express starts its journey from Khulna at 09:00 am and arrives Dhaka at 05:55 pm. Then it departs Dhaka at 07:00 pm and arrives Khulna at 03:40 am. During its run, Chitra Express crosses Jamuna Bridge and Hardinge Bridge.

References

External links

Named passenger trains of Bangladesh
Transport in Khulna